Epicrocis stibiella is a species of snout moth in the genus Epicrocis. It was described by Pieter Cornelius Tobias Snellen in 1872. It is found in the Democratic Republic of the Congo and South Africa.

References

Moths described in 1872
Phycitini
Insects of the Democratic Republic of the Congo
Moths of Africa